Hassleria is a genus of moths in the subfamily Arctiinae. It contains the single species Hassleria majas, which is found in Paraguay.

References

Natural History Museum Lepidoptera generic names catalog

Lithosiini